Napier South is a suburb of the city of Napier, in the Hawke's Bay region of New Zealand's eastern North Island.

Demographics

Napier South had a population of 4,731 at the 2018 New Zealand census, an increase of 186 people (4.1%) since the 2013 census, and an increase of 210 people (4.6%) since the 2006 census. There were 1,833 households, comprising 2,235 males and 2,496 females, giving a sex ratio of 0.9 males per female, with 969 people (20.5%) aged under 15 years, 870 (18.4%) aged 15 to 29, 2,163 (45.7%) aged 30 to 64, and 729 (15.4%) aged 65 or older.

Ethnicities were 83.8% European/Pākehā, 21.3% Māori, 2.9% Pacific peoples, 4.8% Asian, and 2.0% other ethnicities. People may identify with more than one ethnicity.

The percentage of people born overseas was 15.8, compared with 27.1% nationally.

Although some people chose not to answer the census's question about religious affiliation, 56.0% had no religion, 30.1% were Christian, 2.0% had Māori religious beliefs, 0.7% were Hindu, 0.7% were Muslim, 0.6% were Buddhist and 2.9% had other religions.

Of those at least 15 years old, 699 (18.6%) people had a bachelor's or higher degree, and 708 (18.8%) people had no formal qualifications. 468 people (12.4%) earned over $70,000 compared to 17.2% nationally. The employment status of those at least 15 was that 1,839 (48.9%) people were employed full-time, 597 (15.9%) were part-time, and 162 (4.3%) were unemployed.

Education
It opened as Napier West School in 1914.

It was founded in 1933.

Both schools are co-educational. Rolls are as of

References

Suburbs of Napier, New Zealand
Populated places around Hawke Bay